The Changan Eado (逸动) is a compact car produced by Chinese auto manufacturer Changan.

The first generation was introduced in 2012 with the DT hatchback added in 2013 and the electric variant added in 2014. A performance DT RS hatchback was also offered. The second generation model was launched as both a sedan and the DT hatchback in 2018 and the spawned electric variant launched in 2019 with a facelift revealed in 2019 for the 2020 model year, with the sedan being the only model facelifted while the hatchback was discontinued due to low sales.



First generation

The first generation Changan Eado started sales since 2012. The vehicle was styled by Changan’s Italian design center in Turin and debuted as concept car C201 at the Beijing Auto Show 2010, the production car was shown at the International Motor Show 2011 in Frankfurt am Main . The delivery of the sedan started on March 27, 2012. The later Changan CS35 crossover is also based on the Eado.

The drivetrain is powered by a 1.6-liter gasoline engine with an output of 83 kW (113 hp). In addition to a 5-speed manual transmission , a 4-speed automatic transmission is also available.

Eado XT/Eado XT RS 
At the Shanghai Auto Show 2013 was presented with the Eado XT as a hatchback variant. This came on 28 August 2013 in the trade. The Eado XT hatchback is based on the Changan Eado sedan that was launched in March last year. A performance version with a turbo of the Eado XT was launched later in the market called the Eado XT RS.

Eado Blue 
The Eado Blue is a PHEV, or plug-in hybrid electric vehicle version of the Eado sedan. The powertrain was based on the gasoline 1.5 liter four-cylinder with 112 hp.

Eado EV300 
Changan Eado EV is a full electric version of the Changan Eado sedan with a 26 kWh lithium-ion battery. Curb weight is 1610 kg. Range is 160 kilometer and top speed is 140 km/hr. The Changan Eado EV debuted on the 2014 Beijing Auto Show in April featuring a blue painted grilles to differentiate from the regular Eado. Power comes from an electric motor with 120 hp, mated to a CVT transmission.

Eado EV460 
In 2018 the EV460 went on sale for a price of RMB 203,400 before subsidies. It offered an improved range over the EV300 of 550 km and fast charging capability. A batch of 100 EV460 with a battery swap modification went into service as taxis in Chongqing in 2021. The battery swap can be completed within 20 seconds.

Second generation

Details of the second generation Changan Eado sedan and second generation Changan Eado XT were released in January 2018. Price of the Eado XT II ranges from 72,000 yuan to around 97,000 yuan. Engines available are a 125 hp 1.6L with a five-speed manual or six-speed automatic, and a 170 hp 1.5L turbo with a 7-speed Dual-clutch transmission.

Changan Eado II sedan

Changan Eado XT II

Changan Eado EV
The Changan Eado EV or Eado EV300 is the electric variant of the second generation Eado sedan. The Changan Eado EV is powered by an electric motor producing 100 kw, and is capable of a driving range of 405 km with a full battery. Prices of the Changan Eado EV in China ranges from 129.900 yuan to 139.900 yuan ($18.320 - $19.730).

Changan Eado Plus
As of December 2019, Changan has officially unveiled the 2020 Eado sedan facelift named the Eado Plus sedan in China. The Eado Plus offers 2 distinctive styling appearance trims for buyers to choose from including Standard and Sports. The dimensions of the Eado Plus measures 4,730 mm in length, 1,820 mm in width and 1,505 mm in height with a wheelbase of 2,700 mm. Engine options include a 1.6 liter naturally aspirated engine producing 127hp and a 1.4 liter turbocharged engine producing 157 hp, mated to transmissions including a 5-speed manual gearbox, a 6-speed manual gearbox and a 7-speed dual clutch transmission. The new 2020 Changan Eado Plus went on sale in China in March 2020.

References

External links 

  (Eado)
  (Eado XT)

Cars introduced in 2012
2010s cars
Cars of China
Front-wheel-drive vehicles
Eado XT
Compact cars
Sedans
Hatchbacks